Orit Wolf (born 1974 in Tel Aviv) is an Israeli pianist, composer and lecturer. Currently holds lecturer positions at the Royal Academy of Music in London and at Reichman University (IDC Arison School for Business Management), Israel. From 2022-2023 academic year, Wolf will be artist in residence at the Technion.

Education
Starting at the age of six, Orit Wolf studied piano with Hanna Shalgi. At the age of 16, she graduated from Thelma Yelin High School for the Arts and studied with Alexander Volkov. She then began her academic studies at the Tel Aviv University under the direction of Arie Vardi. She also studied music composition and improvisation with Andre Hajdu while attending masterclasses given by Leon Fleisher, Claude Frank, Menachem Pressler, Gyorge Shebok, Gilbert Kalish and Peter Serkin.

In 1991, Wolf attended the Boston University Tanglewood Institute and then received a full Dean's scholarship to Boston University. She graduated from Boston University summa cum laude in piano performance under Benjamin Pasternack and Composer Lukas Foss.

Wolf received a post-graduate degree and her Masters from the Royal Academy of Music in 1998 under the direction of Christopher Elton. She was also studying with Maria Curcio.

In 2007, Wolf earned a Ph.D under the President Scholarships from Bar-Ilan University in Musicology. Her thesis title was "Beethoven as Heard by the Romantics: A Study of Romantic Style Cadenzas Composed to Beethoven's Fourth Piano Concerto". Her tutor was Judit Frygiesi.

Performances and distinctions
At the age of 11, Wolf was invited to perform in Germany and Belgium on behalf of the Israel Broadcasting Authority. At the age of 14, she recorded fa number of performances or Kol Ha-Musica, an Israeli classical music radio station, including own compositions.

Wolf has performed as a soloist and with various orchestras including the Israel Chamber Orchestra, Jerusalem Symphony Orchestra, Rishon LeZion Symphony, Braslaw Philharmonic, Royal Academy Symphony Orchestra and the English Chamber Orchestra. She has played at the Tanglewood Music Festival and Israel Festival, East West Festival (Netherlands) and the Upper Galilee Music Festival. She has played in concert halls such as the Wigmore Hall, St. Martin Hall (London), Boston Symphony Hall, the Concertgebouw (Amsterdam) and the Alte Oper (Frankfurt).

Wolf has collaborated with numerous international artists and ensembles such as St. Lawerence Quartet, Aviv Quartet, Joanna McGreggor, Nobuko Imai, Simca Heled, David D'or,  Erez Ofer, Sergei Krylov, Hagai Shaham, Hillel Zori, Shlomi Shaban, David D'eor and Christine Brewer. She recorded for radio stations including the BBC, CBS, CBC, IBO, WGBH, NRK and GLR.

In 2007 Wolf released a CD titled Impulse.

Since 2007 Wolf conducts concert lectures, mainly from the Tel Aviv Museum of Art, especially a concert series named On a Personal Note. She is also an artistic director of concert series in the Israel Museum, Jerusalem Theatre, Haifa Museum, Beer Sheva, Ashdod, Nahariya, Kfar Yona, Raanana and Kfar Shmaryu. In 2019, she received the Rozenblum Prize for her distinctive contribution to the music world by the Tel Aviv Municipality.

Wolf gave a TED talk titled "Play the Keynote of your Life".

Wolf is also a business consultant in the area of innovative thinking and creative marketing. in 2010 The Marker Magazine has chosen her as one of the hundred most influential people of the year.

In 2022 Wolf was appointed Artist in Campus by the Technion.

Compositions 
 Associations from Liszt for piano, 1990 
 Memories from a Temple for piano solo, 1994  
 Prelude and Fugue for piano, 1995
 Nostalgia from Grandfather for piano, 1997
 Kol Nidrei for piano, 2000
 Association from Liszt for viola, clarinet and piano, 2001
 Ben Haim/Orit Wolf: Lullaby (transcription) for violin, clarinet and piano, 2002
 Human’s Love for violin and piano, 2003
Cadenza for Mozart’s piano concerto no. 23 KV 488, 2005
 White, Light and Argaman for orchestra, 2006 (premiered by the Rishon Lezziyon Symphony Orchestra in 2006)
 Introspection for violin and piano, 2007
Longings for piano, 2007

References

Living people
1974 births
20th-century classical composers
21st-century classical composers
20th-century pianists
21st-century pianists
Israeli composers
Israeli pianists
Israeli businesspeople
People from Tel Aviv
Academic staff of Bar-Ilan University
Women classical composers
20th-century women composers
21st-century women composers
20th-century women pianists
21st-century women pianists